Shenaz Treasurywala (born 29 June 1981) is an Indian actress and travel vlogger.

Career 

Discovered by a photographer during her first year in college, her first modeling assignment was for the soft drink Gold Spot.  She also did advertising work for Akai and Philips before MTV Networks Asia hired her to work as a VJ on the MTV's Most Wanted program.

Her acting debut was in the 2001 Telugu film Eduruleni Manishi, followed by the 2003 Bollywood film Ishq Vishk, which earned her a nomination for the best supporting actress award by the Filmfare Film Awards. With her lifelong love of travel, she wrote travel articles for Cosmopolitan, Elle, and Femina.  As of the early 2010s, Treasurywala resides in Mumbai, India and serves as the host of Culture Shock on the Travel Channel. In 2011, she got a recurring role as Rama Patel on the American soap opera One Life to Live. A few months later, she signed a contract with the show until its cancellation in 2012 and then returned as a contract player when the show started airing its webisodes in 2013.

Treasury' returned to India to visit her family and was offered a leading role in Ishq Vishk after meeting director Ken Ghosh at a Mumbai night club.

In 2009, she appeared in the films Aagey Se Right and Radio. She wrote the screenplay for and appeared in the 2011 movie Luv Ka The End. She also appeared in the movie Delhi Belly. She is part of the film Main Aur Mr. Riight.

During 2015, she was a contributor and occasional panelist on The Nightly Show with Larry Wilmore on Comedy Central in the United States.

In 2017, she appeared in the critically acclaimed indie film The Big Sick where she played Kumail Nanjiani's sister-in-law.

She has also hosted All Women Special Wrestling Event "WWE Evolution" on 28 October 2018.

Social activism 
In December 2014, days before the release of her film Main Aur Mr. Riight (on 12 December), Shenaz Treasurywala wrote an open letter to the most powerful people of India including Narendra Modi, Sachin Tendulkar, Amitabh Bachchan, Salman Khan, Shah Rukh Khan, Aamir Khan and Anil Ambani on women's safety in India.

Personal life 

Her father is a merchant marine engineer, and she was born in a Parsi family. Treasurywala attended school and college in Mumbai, St. Xavier's College. In 2001, after her break-up, she moved to New York City where she studied method acting at the Lee Strasberg Theatre and Film Institute. While in New York, she also took a writing course at NYU.

Filmography

Films

Television

References

External links 

 
 
 

1981 births
Living people
Indian film actresses
Indian television actresses
Actresses from Mumbai
Female models from Mumbai
Parsi people
Parsi people from Mumbai
Actresses in Hindi cinema
Actresses in Telugu cinema
St. Xavier's College, Mumbai alumni
Lee Strasberg Theatre and Film Institute alumni
Indian expatriate actresses in the United States
Indian VJs (media personalities)
21st-century Indian actresses